Eudonia critica is a moth in the family Crambidae. It was named by Edward Meyrick in 1884. It is endemic to New Zealand.

The wingspan is 13–15.5 mm. The forewings are fuscous-grey, mixed with blackish. The median space is irrorated with white. The hindwings are dark fuscous-grey, becoming darker posteriorly. Adults have been recorded on wing in January.

References

Moths described in 1884
Eudonia
Endemic fauna of New Zealand
Moths of New Zealand
Taxa named by Edward Meyrick
Endemic moths of New Zealand